Kang Yi, may refer to:

 , Chinese politician, deputy director of the State Non-Ferrous Metal Industry Bureau
 Kang Yi (born 1966), Chinese politician, director of the National Bureau of Statistics

See also
 Yi Kang